James Murray Hooker (October 29, 1873 – August 6, 1940) was a lawyer and U.S. Representative from Virginia.

Biography
Born in Buffalo Ridge, Virginia, Hooker attended the public schools.
He was graduated from the College of William and Mary in Williamsburg, Virginia, and from the law department of Washington and Lee University in Lexington, Virginia, in 1896.
He was admitted to the bar in 1896 and commenced practice in Stuart, Virginia.
He served as Commonwealth's attorney for Patrick County, Virginia.
He served as delegate to the Virginia constitutional convention in 1901 and 1902.
He served as member of the board of visitors to the Virginia Military Institute at Lexington in 1901–1906.
He served as member of the Virginia Fisheries Commission in 1908–1914.

Hooker was elected as a Democrat to the Sixty-seventh Congress to fill the vacancy caused by the death of Rorer A. James.
He was reelected to the Sixty-eighth Congress and served from November 8, 1921, to March 3, 1925.
He was not a candidate for renomination in 1924.
He served as delegate to the Democratic National Convention in 1924.
He served as chairman of the Democratic State committee in 1925.
He resumed the practice of his profession at Stuart, Virginia, where he died August 6, 1940.
He was interred in Stuart Cemetery.

Electoral history

1921; Hooker was elected to the U.S. House of Representatives with 63.61% of the vote in a special election, defeating Republican Thomas L. Felts and Independent J.R. Wilson.
1922; Hooker was re-elected with 70.92% of the vote, defeating Republican Charles P. Smith.

Sources

1873 births
1940 deaths
College of William & Mary alumni
Washington and Lee University School of Law alumni
County and city Commonwealth's Attorneys in Virginia
Democratic Party members of the United States House of Representatives from Virginia
20th-century American politicians
People from Amherst County, Virginia
Virginia lawyers